Heiichirō, Heiichiro, Heiichirou or Heiichiroh (written: 平一郎) is a masculine Japanese given name. Notable people with the name include:

, Japanese rugby union player
, Japanese conductor and violist

Japanese masculine given names